This is a list of farms in Cornwall. Cornwall is a ceremonial county and unitary authority area of England within the United Kingdom.

Farms in Cornwall

 Arrallas
 Bodanna 
 Bodgate
 Bodrean
 Carn Arthen 
 Carnebone 
 Churchtown Farm 
 Cornish Cyder Farm 
 Crossgate, Cornwall 
 Dannonchapel 
 Dizzard 
 Duchy Farm
 Froxton 
 Great Bosullow 
 Halton Barton 
 Hay, Cornwall 
 Haye 
 Hendra, Cornwall – the name of seven hamlets in Cornwall
 Hendraburnick 
 Higher Menadew 
 Lanjew 
 Lantuel 
 Lezerea 
 Lower Croan 
 Mayon, Cornwall 
 Menherion 
 Nanceddan 
 New Downs – near Camborne in Cornwall, England, UK.
 Penpoll 
 Pentire, Cornwall 
 Polgear 
 Porthmeor 
 Rescassa 
 Rosevine 
 Tregidden 
 Tregolls 
 Tregullon 
 Trengale 
 Trenoon 
 Tresawson 
 Treveal 
 Trevilder 
 Trevilla
 Trevowhan 
 Troswell 
 West Curry

See also

 Duchy College Rural Business School (Stoke Climsland and Rosewarne)
 List of museums in Cornwall
 List of places in Cornwall
 List of topics related to Cornwall
 List of windmills in Cornwall
 Places of Interest in Cornwall
 Visitor attractions in Cornwall

References

 
Cornwall
Farms